Blechnum occidentale is a fern in the family Blechnaceae. Its native range is from Mexico through Central America and the Caribbean to tropical South America.

Blechnum scaberulum and Blechnum sodiroi have been regarded as separate species, but are now regarded as synonyms of Blechnum occidentale.

References

Blechnaceae